Eric Francis Rothwell (31 December 1901 – 17 January 1991) was a New Zealand lawyer and politician who was Chief Judge of the High Court of Western Samoa from 1957 to 1960.

Biography

Early life
Rothwell was born on 31 December 1901 in Gisborne, New Zealand, to Reverend Benjamin and Henrietta Rothwell. He was educated at Marlborough High School and Nelson College, before attending the University of Otago where he graduated with a Bachelor of Laws degree. He married Ada Kitty Mitchell in 1929, with whom he had one son and one daughter.

Legal career
In 1927, Rothwell started his own legal office in High Street, Lower Hutt, as a sole practitioner. He gradually took on partners, initially John Stanhope Reid in the 1930s, then Keith Gibson joined in 1945 to become Rothwell, Reid & Gibson. After Reid left the firm to become a diplomat, Wellington lawyer Babe Page joined the firm in his place which then became Rothwell, Gibson & Page, and now operating from both Lower Hutt and Wellington. They were joined by Jack Marshall, a Member of Parliament and later prime minister, whence the firm was then known as Rothwell, Gibson, Page & Marshall. Rothwell left in 1956 after he had been appointed the Chief Judge of the High Court of Western Samoa.

In 1957, Rothwell was additionally appointed by the government as a stipendiary magistrate and warden. He went on furlough from the High Court in January 1960 when he was appointed to a commission of inquiry to investigate a large fire that occurred in Dunedin in December 1959. In November 1960, he resigned from the High Court of Western Samoa and returned to New Zealand. Upon returning to New Zealand, he served for several months in early 1961 as a relieving magistrate in Auckland before later being appointed to a permanent circuit.

Political career
Rothwell was chairman of the Hutt Urban Adjustment Committee from 1937 to 1938 and president of the Hutt Valley YMCA in 1946. He was elected a member of the Lower Hutt Borough Council on a Citizens' Association ticket at the 1944 local-body elections. Re-elected in 1947, he was appointed deputy mayor in 1949 before being defeated in 1950 (alongside all other Citizens' candidates). At the 1953 election, he stood for the mayoralty but was defeated by the incumbent Labour mayor Percy Dowse.

Rothwell was president of the Hutt Club from 1951 to 1953 and again from 1954 to 1955, and was president of the Hutt Rotary Club from 1955 to 1956.

Later life and death
After retiring as a judge, Rothwell was appointed in February 1975 as chairman of a commission of inquiry into an explosion and fire in Seaview, Lower Hutt, that occurred in September 1974.

Rothwell died on 17 January 1991.

Notes

References

1901 births
1991 deaths
People from Gisborne, New Zealand
People educated at Marlborough Boys' College
People educated at Nelson College
University of Otago alumni
20th-century New Zealand lawyers
20th-century New Zealand politicians
Hutt City Councillors
Deputy mayors of places in New Zealand
20th-century New Zealand judges